Kalispell (YTB-784) was a United States Navy  named after Kalispell, Montana.

Construction

The contract for Kalispell was awarded 14 January 1965. She was laid down on 14 September 1965 at Marinette, Wisconsin, by Marinette Marine and launched 13 December 1965.

Operational history
Placed in service 3 May 1966, Kalispell served in the 5th Naval District at Norfolk, Virginia until the Vietnam war when she was reassigned to Task Force 117, the Mobile Riverine Force and participated in many campaigns.  After the war she served in Subic Bay, Republic of the Philippines and Diego Garcia before being scrapped in 2005.  She earned eight campaign stars for Vietnam War service.

References

  NavSource Online: Service Ship Photo Archive Kalispell (YTB-784)

External links
 

Natick-class large harbor tugs
Ships built by Marinette Marine
1965 ships